Eugamandus oakleyi is a species of longhorn beetles of the subfamily Lamiinae. It was described by Fisher in 1935.

References

Beetles described in 1935
Acanthocinini